Túc Tông is the temple name used for several monarchs of Vietnam. It may refer to:

Lê Túc Tông (1488–1504)
Nguyễn Phúc Trú (1696–1738), one of the Nguyễn lords

See also
Suzong (disambiguation) (Chinese equivalent)
Sukjong (disambiguation) (Korean equivalent)

Temple name disambiguation pages